Janowa Góra  is a village in the administrative district of Gmina Stronie Śląskie, within Kłodzko County, Lower Silesian Voivodeship, in south-western Poland. 

The village has a population of 4.

Villages in Kłodzko County